Kudinovsky is a rural locality (a khutor) in Bolshelychakskoye Rural Settlement, Frolovsky District, Volgograd Oblast, Russia. The population was 8 as of 2010.

Geography 
Kudinovsky is located in steppe, on the right bank of the Lychak River, 57 km north of Prigorodny (the district's administrative centre) by road. Bolshoy Lychak is the nearest rural locality.

References 

Rural localities in Frolovsky District